This page documents notable tornadoes and tornado outbreaks worldwide in 2003. Strong and destructive tornadoes form most frequently in the United States, Bangladesh, and Eastern India, but they can occur almost anywhere under the right conditions. Tornadoes also develop occasionally in southern Canada during the Northern Hemisphere's summer and somewhat regularly at other times of the year across Europe, Asia, and Australia. Tornadic events are often accompanied with other forms of severe weather, including strong thunderstorms, strong winds, and hail.

There were 1,395 tornadoes reported in the United States in 2003, of which 1,374 were confirmed. 2003 is currently the seventh-most active year for tornadoes in the United States since reliable record-keeping began in 1950.

Events

January
January had no tornadoes confirmed in the United States. It was only the fifth time since 1950 that an entire calendar month went tornado-free. The other months were; October 1952, December 1963, November 1976, and January 1986.

February
There were 18 tornadoes confirmed in the US in February.

February 2 (Africa)
A tornado killed 17 people near the town of Yumbi in the northwestern Bandundu Province of the Democratic Republic of the Congo. Over 4,000 people were injured, 217 seriously.

February 17–18  (Pakistan)
On the 17th, a tornado killed five people and injured 35 in Gadap Town, Pakistan. More than 80 structures were destroyed, and many livestock were killed as well.

Another tornado struck the next day near Lahore in eastern Pakistan, killing two people and injuring 150. 400 homes were destroyed in four villages.

February 21–22
A rare winter storm caused eight tornadoes. At 3:13 PM, an F1 tornado touched down in the rugged rural hills of extreme western Breathitt County, Kentucky, near Athol. Two people were killed as five trailers were destroyed, and many anothers were damaged.

March
There were 43 tornadoes confirmed in the US in March.

March 17–20

A tornado outbreak produced 27 tornadoes from Texas to Georgia. During a three-day period from the 17th to the 19th, 22 F1 and F0 tornadoes touched down across a widespread area, mostly in Oklahoma, Louisiana, Alabama, and Tennessee. On the 19th, an F1 tornado near Cookeville, Tennessee killed one person when a trailer was thrown 100 yards. The tornado damaged houses, barns, trailers, garages, sheds, and at least one church. Many trees were downed as well. Another F1 tornado damaged three mobile homes, 11 homes and four businesses from the Rosalie to Flat Rock communities in Alabama.

The final day of the outbreak was the most devastating. On the evening of the 20th, a supercell thunderstorm developed in the Florida Panhandle, producing an F2 tornado that struck Cypress. Two mobile homes and a single-family home were destroyed. 15 single-family and mobile homes were damaged. Numerous trees and power lines were downed. One person was seriously injured and two sustained minor injuries in the Cypress area. The supercell continued into Georgia and produced an F3 tornado. The tornado tore through Mitchell County impacting subdivisions on the south side of Camilla. Unbelievably, another F3 tornado followed nearly this same track back in February 2000. Some residents in Camilla rebuilt homes destroyed by the tornado three years ago, only to find their new homes damaged or destroyed by this tornado. The tornado destroyed a total 66 homes, and damaged 200 homes and businesses, with the hardest hit area being the Goodson Road area of Camilla. The tornado then continued into Worth County, producing more damage before dissipating. Six people were killed and 200 were injured.

Both Mitchell and Worth Counties declared a state of emergency as a result of the tornadoes. Numerous trees and power lines were downed as well. Overall, the outbreak caused seven fatalities.

March 27

Eight tornadoes struck South Florida, including an F2 tornado that struck the Liberty City neighborhood of Miami and caused one death and 14 injuries. The fatality was the first tornado-related death in Miami-Dade County since 1925. As a result of that tornado, the Federal Emergency Management Agency (FEMA) dispersed over $8.4 million in funds. Additionally, an F1 tornado struck North Miami Beach and caused damage to trees and roofs, but no injuries were reported.

April
There were 156 tornadoes reported in the US in April.

April 4–7

A tornado outbreak spawned 41 tornadoes from Idaho to Alabama. There were no fatalities, but 14 people were injured.

April 15

A small tornado outbreak struck Oklahoma and Texas, injuring one.

May
There were 542 tornadoes confirmed in the US in May. That set a former all time record high for a single month until April 2011 with 775 tornadoes, as well as the current record high for the month of May.

May 3–11

An intense series of tornado outbreaks occurred from May 3 to May 11. Tornadoes began occurring over the affected area on April 30, but the most prolific continuous period was the seven-day period of May 4–10. There were 401 tornadoes confirmed in 19 states and one Canadian province, 1,587 reports of large hail, and 740 reports of wind damage. More severe weather broke out this week alone than any other week in U.S. history, though comparable events occurred in May 1896, 1917, 1930, and 1949 before the modern era of tornado detection. There was a severe weather outbreak every day during the week. There were 48 people killed by the tornadoes, and damages totaled nearly $1 billion. Six F4 tornadoes touched down.

The main meteorological factor for this series of tornado outbreaks was the presence of a persistent 500 mb trough over the western United States, coupled with a series of shortwave disturbances which propagated through the central and eastern United States. These shortwaves provided a mechanism for the deepening of surface low pressure areas, which followed the upper level flow from southwest to northeast. The cyclones induced a strong south to southeasterly flow in the low levels of the atmosphere (1000 mb, 850 mb) off the Gulf of Mexico. This persistent flow provided an abundance of warm, moist maritime tropical air in the central and eastern US.

May 4 (Bangladesh)
At least 20 people were killed by a tornado in several remote villages in the Brahmanbaria District of Bangladesh.

May 18 (Australia)

An F2 tornado struck Bendigo, Victoria, Australia, damaging more than 50 houses on a 7 km path.

June
There were 292 tornadoes confirmed in the US in June.

June 22–23

Hail between the size of softballs and volleyballs fell in Aurora, Nebraska on June 22 along with another storm to the East that produced a tornado. One person died and seven people were injured from a F2 tornado and another died the next night due to a F4 tornado. One of the largest hailstones ever measured fell, 17.8 cm (7.0 in) in diameter with a 47.6 cm (18.75 in) circumference.
27 tornadoes were confirmed, with all seven injuries and both deaths coming from Nebraska.

June 21–24

A large tornado outbreak struck the Northern Plains, mainly in the state of South Dakota. The strongest tornado was a large F4 tornado that touched down near Huron, ripping through rural farmland before completely annihilating the town of Manchester. Four people were injured, and Manchester later became a ghost town. Despite 125 tornadoes touching down during the outbreak, there were only 2 fatalities, both being in Nebraska.

July
There were 167 tornadoes in the US in July.

July 21
A significant tornado and derecho event affected the northeastern United States. The event began with four weak F0 tornadoes in Indiana. Around 3:20 pm, an F1 tornado touched down in Pennsylvania and struck Kinzua Bridge State Park, destroying the 103-year-old Kinzua Bridge. Many trees were downed throughout the park. At about 7:30 pm, a long tracked supercell thunderstorm spawned a series of tornadoes along a path of 61 miles through New York and Vermont. It produced an F2 that had multiple vortices at one point, and at its strongest near Kinderhook Lake, New York produced considerable damage. A barn was completely destroyed and its contents thrown into Kinderhook Lake. A car was flipped, one person was injured, and trees were snapped as well. Another F2 tornado near Catskill, New York destroyed several homes and injured 7 people. One woman was injured in a mobile home as it was lifted into the air then smashed into the ground. Additional weak tornadoes and wind damage occurred in Vermont. The most powerful tornado of the day was an F3 that struck near the town of Elysburg, Pennsylvania, where a farm was completely leveled. Another home was extensively damaged, and a car was thrown 600 yards. A tractor was lofted into a stand of trees as well. Widespread derecho damage occurred as well throughout the region. The derecho itself produced a very intense mesoscale convective vortex, and at times, the entire squall line was wrapped into it, creating a "Super-Derecho", also known as a Landphoon. Overall, the outbreak produced 26 tornadoes.

August
There were 44 tornadoes confirmed in the US in August.

August 7 
There were four reported tornadoes, including an F1 tornado in Palm Beach Gardens, Florida. This tornado caused minor damage.

September
There were 32 tornadoes confirmed in the US in September.

September 23
An F1 tornado hit Ewing and Lawrence townships, in Mercer County, New Jersey.  There were no fatalities, but there was widespread damage to homes. The tornado touched down in Ewing near Prospect Street, crossed Olden Avenue, and entered Lawrence Township near the Shabukunk Creek. In Lawrenceville, the tornado followed a path parallel to and slightly northwest of Princeton Pike. Olden Avenue in Ewing was closed for several days while debris and downed power poles were removed. Several retail stores at the Mercer Mall and the Nassau Park retail center were also damaged.

October
There were 26 tornadoes confirmed in the US in October.

October 29
An F0 tornado struck suburban Miami Gardens, Florida. No deaths or injuries were reported, and damage was relatively minor; damage to fencing and landscaping, roof damage to a trailer, and destruction of a patio and carport. The widely scattered nature of the damage supported the F0 classification.

November
There were 53 tornadoes confirmed in the US in November.

November 17–18

On November 17, the Storm Prediction Center forecast a moderate risk of severe thunderstorms for much of the Deep South from the Ohio Valley to the Gulf Coast as an upper-level low ran into very unstable air. During the evening hours, numerous tornadoes broke out across portions of Southeast Texas and Central Louisiana, resulting in 56 injuries. Most of these tornadoes were weak, but five of them reached F2 intensity. Damage from this tornado outbreak totaled $9.934 million.

November 26–27

During the late evening hours of November 26 (the night before Thanksgiving), severe weather broke out across portions of West-Central Louisiana. The worst storm spawned an F2 tornado, which formed in Beauregard Parish and traveled northeast into Vernon Parish.

December
There was one tornado confirmed in the US in December.

December 15 (Argentina)

An F3 or F2 tornado caused destruction in the small town of Atalaya, in the province of Corrientes, in eastern Argentina. Dozens of homes and cars were destroyed and animals flew in the tornado. It had a path that was 1 km long. It killed 5 and injured 50.

December 21 (Australia)

A minor tornado hit near Inverleigh, Victoria, Australia, causing severe damage to a farm.

December 23 (Argentina)

In the southern portion the city of Cordoba, the second largest city in Argentina, an F3 tornado formed. 400 houses, dozens of cars and 1000 trees were damaged or destroyed in this tornado, which lasted for 25 minutes and swept through three neighborhoods, making it the longest lived tornado in the Southern Hemisphere. It was filmed by television cameras and by many people on the ground. The tornado caused five deaths and wounded 90.

See also
 Tornado
 Tornadoes by year
 Tornado records
 Tornado climatology
 Tornado myths
 List of tornado outbreaks
 List of F5 and EF5 tornadoes
 List of F4 and EF4 tornadoes
 List of North American tornadoes and tornado outbreaks
 List of 21st-century Canadian tornadoes and tornado outbreaks
 List of European tornadoes and tornado outbreaks
 List of tornadoes and tornado outbreaks in Asia
 List of Southern Hemisphere tornadoes and tornado outbreaks
 List of tornadoes striking downtown areas
 List of tornadoes with confirmed satellite tornadoes
 Tornado intensity
 Fujita scale
 Enhanced Fujita scale
 International Fujita scale
 TORRO scale

References

External links 
 U.S. tornadoes in 2003 – Tornado History Project
 Tornado Project tornadoes 2003
 Storm Data "2003 Annual Summaries" (NCDC)

 
2003 meteorology
Tornado-related lists by year
Articles containing video clips
2003-related lists